There were two gymnastics competitions at the 2009 Mediterranean Games:

Artistic gymnastics at the 2009 Mediterranean Games
Rhythmic gymnastics at the 2009 Mediterranean Games

Gymnastics
2009
Mediterranean Games